The Gaelic Language (Scotland) Act 2005 is an Act of the Scottish Parliament passed in 2005. It was the first  piece of legislation dedicated to the Scottish Gaelic language and was seen as the first hesitant step by the Scottish Executive to provide a legislative framework for the use of Gaelic by Scottish Public sector authorities. It created a Gaelic Language Board, but created no general rights of citizens or obligations on statutory authorities to actually use the language. This is in contrast to the UK parliament's legislation for the Welsh Language (the Welsh Language Act 1993) which authorises the use of Welsh in public administration. There has been no significant development of the Gaelic Language (Scotland) Act 2005 between 2005 and 2021.

Passage of the Act
The bill was introduced into the Scottish Parliament on 28 September 2004 by Peter Peacock. On 21 August 2005 the Parliament voted unanimously to approve the bill.

Purpose 
The Gaelic Language Act aims to secure Gaelic as an official language of Scotland, "commanding equal respect" with English, by establishing  as part of the framework of government in Scotland and also requiring the creation of a national plan for Gaelic to provide strategic direction for the development of the Gaelic language.  [Note: The phrase "equal respect" contains no clear meaning in the law. Its usage was chosen to prevent the assumption that the Gaelic language is in any way considered to have "equal validity or parity of esteem with English".]

The Act also gives  a key role in promoting Gaelic in Scotland, advising Scottish Ministers on Gaelic issues, driving forward Gaelic planning and preparing guidance on Gaelic education. The Act also provides a framework for the creation of Gaelic language plans by Scottish public authorities.

Former Education Minister Peter Peacock, who, at the time of the Act coming into force, had ministerial responsibility for Gaelic, said: "This is a momentous day for Gaelic as we open a new chapter in the language's history. We have come a long way since the dark days of 1616 when an Act of Parliament ruled that Gaelic should be 'abolishit and removit' from Scotland."

A key limitation of the act is that it applies only to public bodies operating in Scotland and whose business is classed as being a devolved matter (outlined by the Scotland Act 1998).

The National Gaelic Language Plan 2012–17
"The Plan includes proposals for the promotion of strategies for increasing the number able to speak Gaelic, encouraging its use and facilitating access to Gaelic language and culture." The Plan addresses the following:

 An increase in the acquisition and use of Gaelic by young people in the home and increased numbers of children entering Gaelic-medium early years education.
 An increase in the number of children enrolling in Gaelic-medium education (GME), doubling the current annual intake to 800 by 2017. 
 A year on year increase in the number of pupils engaged in Gaelic-learner education (GLE) in both primary and secondary schools.
 An expansion in the availability of Gaelic-medium subjects in secondary schools.
 An increase in the number of adults acquiring Gaelic from the current total of around 2,000 to 3,000 by 2017 and enhanced language skills among fluent Gaelic speakers. 
 More opportunities for communities and networks of Gaelic speakers of all kinds to use Gaelic and increased use of the language in community activities and services.
 Expansion of the use of Gaelic in places of work and an increase in employment opportunities where Gaelic skills are required in order to enable service delivery in the language.
 Development of Gaelic arts and media as a means of promoting the language, attracting people to it and enhancing their commitment through opportunities to learn, use and develop Gaelic.
 An increased profile for Gaelic in the heritage and tourism sectors and increased use of Gaelic in the interpretation of Scotland’s history and culture.
 Co-ordination of the initiatives of parties active in Gaelic language corpus development to achieve enhanced strength, relevance, consistency and visibility of the Gaelic language in Scotland.

See also
List of Acts of the Scottish Parliament from 1999
Official Languages Act 2003 (Republic of Ireland)
Welsh Language Act 1967
Welsh Language Act 1993
Irish Language Act (Northern Ireland)
Language policy

Sources

External links

Acts of the Scottish Parliament 2005
Scottish Gaelic language
Language legislation